Oliver Warner Farmstead is a historic farm complex and national historic district located in the towns of Hopewell and Phelps near Clifton Springs in Ontario County, New York. The  district contains three contributing buildings.  The buildings are a cobblestone farmhouse built about 1840 in the late Federal / early Greek Revival style, a 19th-century barn, and 19th century wagon house / machine shed.

It was listed on the National Register of Historic Places in 1988.

References

Farms on the National Register of Historic Places in New York (state)
Historic districts on the National Register of Historic Places in New York (state)
Cobblestone architecture
Federal architecture in New York (state)
Greek Revival houses in New York (state)
Houses completed in 1840
Historic districts in Ontario County, New York
National Register of Historic Places in Ontario County, New York